Asbury is an unincorporated community and census-designated place (CDP) located within Franklin Township in Warren County, New Jersey, United States, that was created as part of the 2010 United States Census. As of the 2010 Census, the CDP's population was 273.

History
The community was named for Francis Asbury, the first American bishop of the Methodist Episcopal Church in the United States.

The Asbury Historic District encompassing the community was added to the National Register of Historic Places on March 19, 1993, for its significance in architecture, industry, religion, community development, politics/government, and commerce.

Geography
According to the United States Census Bureau, Asbury had a total area of 0.700 square miles (1.813 km2), including 0.694 square miles (1.798 km2) of land and 0.006 square miles (0.015 km2) of water (0.85%).

Demographics

Census 2010

Census 2000
As of the 2000 United States Census, the population for ZIP Code Tabulation Area 08802 was 3,933.

Transportation
County Route 632 (Asbury Anderson Road) runs east–west through the community and intersects with County Route 643 (Old Main Street), which runs north–south.

Points of interest

The Musconetcong Watershed Association uses the historic Hoffman Grist Mill for its programs on the social, agricultural and industrial heritage of the community. The mill contributes to the Asbury Historic District.

The Plenge Archaeological Site located along the Musconetcong River is one of two major Paleo-Indian sites in New Jersey.

References

External links

 

Census-designated places in Warren County, New Jersey
Franklin Township, Warren County, New Jersey